Callum Charles John Driver (born 23 October 1992) is an English semi-professional footballer who last played as a defender for Leatherhead.

Club career
Driver was born in Sidcup, London. He joined as a youth team player for West Ham aged 12 and signed his first professional contract with the club in July 2011. Having been involved in several first-team squads with West Ham, in January 2012 he moved on loan to League Two club Burton Albion until 31 January 2012. Driver made his debut for Burton on 6 January 2012 in a home game against Accrington Stanley, the match ended 2–0 to Accrington. Driver scored his first goal for Burton on 14 February 2012 in a 3–2 away defeat to Crewe Alexandra. After two months with Burton and without ever playing in a winning team, Driver returned to West Ham. He made his official debut on 5 January 2014 for West Ham against Nottingham Forest at the City Ground in the FA Cup. Driver was released by West Ham at the end of the 2013–14 season.

After being released by West Ham, he signed for Conference South club Whitehawk and went on to make 14 first-team appearances for the club before being released in October 2014. On 11 November 2014 Driver signed a contract with Conference Premier club Dartford going straight into their squad on the same day for their league encounter with Welling United.

In May 2015, following the club's relegation from the Conference Premier, he joined newly promoted National League South club Maidstone United on a free transfer, rejecting a new deal with Dartford. Driver was a regular fixture at right back for the Stones during the 2015–16 season, and helped the club achieve promotion to the National League via the playoffs.

He agreed a new deal with the club for the 2016–17 season.

On 20 January 2017, Driver joined Hemel Hempstead Town on a three-month loan deal. He signed permanently for the club in June 2017, after leaving Maidstone.

On 8 December 2017, Driver joined Welling United and made his debut for the club a day later on 9 December 2017 in a 2–2 draw at Park View Road with Truro City. He scored his first goal for the club, in his third game, on 26 December 2017 in a 3–2 defeat at home to his former club Dartford.

On 22 May 2018, Driver resigned for Dartford.

On 25 January 2019, Driver joined Leatherhead on a month's loan.

Career statistics

Honours
Maidstone United
National League South play-offs: 2015–16

References

External links

Callum Driver profile at the Maidstone United F.C. website

1992 births
Living people
Footballers from Sidcup
English footballers
Association football defenders
West Ham United F.C. players
Burton Albion F.C. players
Whitehawk F.C. players
Dartford F.C. players
Maidstone United F.C. players
Hemel Hempstead Town F.C. players
English Football League players
National League (English football) players
Leatherhead F.C. players
Welling United F.C. players